Martin McNamara (born 1864) was an Irish hurler who played for the Tipperary senior team.

McNamara was a member of the team for just one season during the 1887 championship. It was a successful season as he secured an All-Ireland medal that year. It was Tipperary's first All-Ireland title.

At club level McNamara was a one-time county championship medalist with Thurles Blues.

References

1864 births
Thurles Sarsfields hurlers
Tipperary inter-county hurlers
All-Ireland Senior Hurling Championship winners
Year of death missing